Pauwels is a Flemish patronymic surname derived from the personal name Pauwel, a vernacular form of Paul, and may refer to:

Surname
Eddy Pauwels (1935–2017), Belgian racing cyclist
Emiel Pauwels (1918–2014), Belgian track and field athlete
Emmanuel Pauwels (1903–?), Belgian competitive sailor
Ferdinand Pauwels (1830–1904), Belgian history painter in Germany
Fleur Pauwels (born 2003), Belgian footballer
Frans Pauwels (1918–2001), Dutch racing cyclist
 (1885–1980), German (Aachen) orthopedist known for Pauwel's angle
Isabelle Pauwels (born 1950), Belgian-born Canadian video artist
Ivo Pauwels (born 1950), Belgian author
Jeanne-Catherine Pauwels (1795–1889), Belgian musician
José Pauwels (1928–2012), Belgian racing cyclist
Katrien Pauwels (born 1965), Belgian figure skater
Kevin Pauwels (born 1984), Belgian racing cyclist
Louis Pauwels (1920–1997), Belgian-French journalist and writer
Luc Pauwels (born 1940), Belgian political scientist
Marie-Claire Pauwels (1945–2011), French journalist
Megan Pauwels (born 1976), Australian cricketer
Peter-Frans Pauwels (born 1965), Dutch entrepreneur
Rudi Pauwels (born 1960), Belgian pharmacologist
Sabine Pauwels (born 1966), Belgian swimmer
Serge Pauwels (born 1983), Belgian road bicycle racer
Thierry Pauwels (born 1957), Belgian astronomer
12761 Pauwels, main belt asteroid named after him

Given name
Pauwels Franck (c.1540–1596), Flemish landscape painter
Pauwels van Hillegaert (1596–1640), Dutch painter

Surnames from given names